The M1841 Mississippi rifle is a muzzle-loading percussion rifle used in the Mexican–American War and the American Civil War.

Development
When Eli Whitney Blake took over management of the Whitney Armory in 1842, he set about tooling up under his new contract from the U.S. government for making the model 1841 percussion rifle. Machinery and fixtures for making the 1822 contract flintlock musket had to be retooled or replaced in order to produce the lock and barrel of the new model. Blake hired armourer Thomas Warner as foreman, who, as master armourer at Springfield Armory, had been implementing similar changes there.

Warner spearheaded the drive to equip the Springfield Armory with a set of new, more precise machines, and a system of gauging that made it possible to achieve interchangeability of parts in military small arms.  Under Warner's tutelage, Blake equipped the Whitney Armory to do likewise.

Design and features
The Mississippi rifle was the first standard U.S. military rifle to use a percussion lock system. Percussion lock systems were much more reliable and weatherproof than the flintlock systems that they replaced, and were such an improvement that many earlier flintlock rifles and muskets were later converted to percussion lock systems.

The Mississippi rifle was originally produced in .54 caliber, using 1:66 rifling and no provision for fixing a bayonet.

In 1855, the Mississippi rifle was changed to .58 caliber, so that it could use the .58 caliber Minie Ball that had recently become standard. Many older Mississippi rifles were re-bored to .58 caliber. The rifle was also modified to accept a sword type bayonet.

The first Mississippi rifles had a v-notch sight. This was later replaced with leaf sights with 100, 300, and 500 yard ranges. A ladder sight with ranges from 100 to 1100 yards in 100 yard increments was fitted on some later rifles.

Nickname
The nickname "Mississippi" originated in the Mexican–American War when Jefferson Davis was appointed Colonel of the Mississippi Rifles, a volunteer regiment from Mississippi. Colonel Davis sought to arm his regiment with Model 1841 rifles. At this time, smoothbore muskets were still the primary infantry weapon, and any unit with rifles was considered special and designated as such.

Davis clashed with his commanding officer, General Winfield Scott, who said that the weapons were insufficiently tested and refused Davis' request. Davis took his case to President James K. Polk who overruled Scott. The incident started a lifelong feud between Davis and Scott.

The Mississippi rifle was sometimes referred to as a "yagger" rifle, due to its smaller size and its similarity to the German Jäger rifles.

Legacy

The Model 1841 was replaced by the minie ball firing Springfield Model 1855, which became the standard issue weapon for regular army infantry, and ultimately the Springfield Model 1861 and Model 1863.

By the time of the Civil War, the Mississippi Rifle was generally considered old-fashioned but effective.  It was carried by some Union troops up until 1863, though the 45th New York Infantry still used the rifle beyond Gettysburg). Some Confederate cavalry and sharpshooter units continued to use the rifle until the end of the war, evidenced by surviving Confederate ordnance requisitions.

See also
 155th Infantry Regiment "Mississippi Rifles"
 Rifles in the American Civil War

References

 Brown, Stuart E., The Guns of Harpers Ferry, Baltimore, Md.: Clearfield Co., 2002, 1968., 157 p., 
 "Confederate Tales of the War" By Michael E. Banasik

External links
 Mississippi Rifle - article on the rifle from the National Museum of American History

Early rifles
American Civil War rifles
Weapons of the Confederate States of America
Muzzleloaders